Fidel Santander (born April 13, 1947) is a Mexican sprint canoer who competed in the late 1960s. He was eliminated in the repechages of the K-1 1000 m event at the 1968 Summer Olympics in Mexico City.

References
Sports-reference.com profile

External links

1947 births
Canoeists at the 1968 Summer Olympics
Living people
Mexican male canoeists
Olympic canoeists of Mexico
Place of birth missing (living people)